Jeunesse Sportive Madinet Chéraga, known as JSM Chéraga or JSMC for short, is an Algerian football club based in Chéraga, Algiers, Algeria. The club was founded in 1940 and its colours are red, white and green. Their home stadium, Stade Laamali, has a capacity of 5,248 spectators. The club is currently playing in the Inter-Régions Division.

Notable players
 Salah Assad
 Ali Bencheikh
 Islam Slimani
 Boualem Khoukhi

Managers
  Dan Anghelescu (2013–2014)

External links
 DZFoot.com Team Page

Football clubs in Algeria
Association football clubs established in 1940
Football clubs in Algiers
1940 establishments in Algeria
Sports clubs in Algeria